The 1988–89 Oklahoma Sooners men's basketball team represented the University of Oklahoma in competitive college basketball during the 1988–89 NCAA Division I season. The Oklahoma Sooners men's basketball team played its home games in the Lloyd Noble Center and was a member of the National Collegiate Athletic Association's (NCAA) former Big Eight Conference at that time.  The team posted a 30–6 overall record and a 12–2 conference record to earn the Conference title under head coach Billy Tubbs.  This was the fourth Big Eight Conference regular season Championship for Tubbs and his second in a row.

The team was led by two future 1989 NBA draft first round selections Stacey King and Mookie Blaylock who were both selected as 1989 NCAA Men's Basketball All-Americans. The team won two of its three games at the 1988 Maui Invitational Tournament where it faced three ranked opponents: #16 , #4 UNLV and #3 Michigan who defeated them and eventually won the 1989 NCAA Division I men's basketball tournament. The team then won 11 games in a row before losing to unranked Pitt. The team then won five in a row including victories over #16 Kansas and then #13 UNLV before losing to unranked .  The Sooners, who were ranked in the top 10 all season and the top 5 for the entire 1989 part of its schedule, then won six more in a row including back to back wins against #3 Missouri and #1 Arizona. #7 Missouri ended the streak and gave Oklahoma its final regular season loss.  Oklahoma won its final two regular season games and first two Big Eight tournament games before losing its rubber match against #10 Missouri in the championship game. The team earned a second consecutive #1 seed for the NCAA Division I men's basketball tournament where it advanced to the sweet sixteen before losing to Virginia.

Mookie Blaylock established the current Oklahoma Sooners men's basketball single-season minutes played (1359) and career steals (281) records.  His career steals per game record (3.8) stood as a National Collegiate Athletic Association Division I college basketball record for 13 seasons.   He also tied his own NCAA single-game steals record (13).  Stacey King set the current Sooners single-season free throws made (211) record.  King also set the Big Eight career blocked shots record (228). Tyrone Jones became the first Sooner to make 6 consecutive three point shots (a record since tied by 4 other Sooners).  The team holds the Sooner record with 20 100-point games.

Roster

Schedule and results
 
|-
!colspan=9| Regular season

|-
!colspan=9| Big Eight Conference tournament

|-
!colspan=9| NCAA tournament

NCAA basketball tournament

The following is a summary of the team's performance in the NCAA Division I men's basketball tournament:
Southeast
 Oklahoma (1) 72, East Tennessee State (16) 71
Oklahoma 124, Louisiana Tech (9) 81
Virginia (5) 86, Oklahoma 80 (Sweet 16)

Honors
All-American: Mookie Blaylock and Stacey King (2nd selection)
Big Eight POY: King

Team players drafted into the NBA
The following players were drafted in the 1989 NBA draft:

See also
Oklahoma Sooners men's basketball
List of Oklahoma Sooners men's basketball conference championships
1989 NCAA Division I men's basketball tournament

References

Oklahoma Sooners men's basketball seasons
Oklahoma
Oklahoma